Leon Bunn (born 27 August 1992), is a German professional boxer.

Amateur career

Bunn's amateur record was 80/25/7 (won/lost/draw). He won numerous federal and national championships. From 2011 to 2014 Bunn remained undefeated as a German division contender in German Boxing Bundesliga in 13 bouts, fighting for CSC Frankfurt and SV Nordhausen. In 2014 Bunn and his team SV Nordhausen won the German national team championship before he reached finals of the German national light heavyweight championship earning a second place by fight cancellation due to Bunn's cut injury from semi finals. In 2015 he reached finals again and succeeded to win the German national light heavyweight championship after already winning the prestigious international Chemistry Cup in Halle, which is an AIBA tournament of highest category, by defeating Switzerland's Uke Smajli.

 11-times Champion of Hesse (2005–2015)
 2010: German Junior Champion of Olympic Boxing
 German Division (Bundesliga)-Season 2011/2012: Undefeated in six bouts for CSC Frankfurt (2nd German Division)
 German Division (Bundesliga)-Season 2012/2013: Undefeated in two bouts for SV Nordhausen (1st German Division)
 German Division (Bundesliga)-Season 2013/2014: Undefeated in five bouts for SV Nordhausen (1st German Division)
 2014: Round Robin Tournament winner: Germany vs Russia. Award for best techniques
 2014: German Light Heavyweight Vice Champion
 2014: German Team Champion 1st division for SV Nordhausen
 2015: German Light Heavyweight Champion
 2015: Chemistry Cup International Light Heavyweight Champion

Pro career

Leon Bunn's professional debut took place on 3 December 2016 in Sofia, when he defeated his opponent Gordan Glisic by first round TKO. Bunn was signed by Sauerland Events and is coached by Ulli Wegner.

In 2017 Bunn also won his Sauerland debut and four more consecutive fights by KO. In his sixth fight as a professional he defeated his opponent Tomasz Gargula (POL) in round 5 via TKO although he had a broken hand.

Bunn fought six times in 2018, including bouts in Norway and Croatia. Bunn was able to elaborate his professional record by five unanimous decisions and another TKO remaining unbeaten in all of his first twelve fights.

After fighting Viktor Polyakov in Koblenz on 16 February 2019 Bunn was announced to fight German contender Leon Harth for IBF's International Light Heavyweight title in Frankfurt's Fraport Arena on 4 May.

Professional boxing record

Personal life
Leon Bunn is a member of Frankfurt's internationally known fight club MMA Spirit, fighting for its box club Spirit Frankfurt. If not in Berlin Bunn is coached by his father Ralph.

References

External links
 BoxRec profile
 Sauerland Events profile page of Leon Bunn
 Leon Bunn's official Instagram profile

Living people
German male boxers
Sportspeople from Frankfurt
1992 births
Light-heavyweight boxers